The Thiepval Memorial to the Missing of the Somme is a war memorial to 72,337 missing British and South African servicemen who died in the Battles of the Somme of the First World War between 1915 and 1918, with no known grave. It is near the village of Thiepval, Picardy in France. A visitors' centre opened in 2004. Designed by Sir Edwin Lutyens, Thiepval has been described as "the greatest executed British work of monumental architecture of the twentieth century".

Location
The grounds of the original château were not chosen as this would have required the moving of graves, dug during the war around the numerous medical aid stations.

Design and inauguration
Designed by Sir Edwin Lutyens, the memorial was built between 1928 and 1932 and is the largest Commonwealth Memorial to the Missing in the world. It was inaugurated by the Prince of Wales (later King Edward VIII) in the presence of Albert Lebrun, President of France, on 1 August 1932. The unveiling ceremony was attended by Lutyens.

The memorial dominates the rural scene and has 16 brick piers, faced with Portland stone. It was originally built using French bricks from Lille, but was refaced in 1973 with Accrington brick. The main arch is aligned east to west.

It is a complex form of memorial arch, comprising interlocking arches of four sizes. Each side of the main arch is pierced by a smaller arch, orientated at a right angle to the main arch. Each side of each of these smaller arches is then pierced by a still smaller arch and so on. The keystone of each smaller arch is at the level of the spring of the larger arch that it pierces; each of these levels is marked by a stone cornice. This design results in 16 piers, having 64 stone-panelled sides. Only 48 of these are inscribed, as the panels around the outside of the memorial are blank.

More succinctly, according to the architectural historian Stephen Games, the memorial is composed of two intersecting triumphal arches, each with a larger central arch and two smaller subsidiary arches, the arches on the east–west facades being taller than those on the north–south, and all raised up from what is loosely a square four-by-four tartan grid plan. The main arch is surmounted by a tower. In the central space of the memorial a Stone of Remembrance rests on a three-stepped platform.

The memorial represents the names 72,246 officers and men (see below), and Lutyens's ingenious geometry arises out of the attempt to display these names in compact form, rather than in the longer, lower and linear form taken by other memorials to the missing of the war, such as those at Loos, Pozières and Arras.

Inscriptions
The inscription of names on the memorial is reserved for those missing, or unidentified, soldiers who have no known grave. A large inscription on an internal surface of the memorial reads:

On the Portland stone piers are engraved the names of over 72,000 men who were lost in the Somme battles between July 1915 and March 1918. The Commonwealth War Graves Commission states that over 90% of these soldiers died in the first Battle of the Somme between 1 July and 18 November 1916. The names are carved using the standard upper-case lettering designed for the commission by MacDonald Gill.

Over the years since its inauguration, bodies have been regularly discovered on the former battlefield and are sometimes identified through various means.  The decision was taken that to protect the integrity of the memorial as one solely for those who are missing or unidentified, that if a body were found and identified the inscription of their name would be removed from the memorial by filling in the inscription with cement.  For those who are found and identified, they are given a funeral with full military honours at a cemetery close to the location at which they were discovered. This practice has resulted in numerous gaps in the lists of names.

On the top of the archway, a French inscription reads: Aux armées Française et Britannique l'Empire Britannique reconnaissant (To the French and British Armies, from the grateful British Empire). Just below this, are carved the years 1914 and 1918. On the upper edges of the side archways, split across left and right, is carved the phrase "The Missing / of the Somme".

Also included on this memorial are sixteen stone laurel wreaths, inscribed with the names of sub-battles that made up the Battle of the Somme and subsequent actions in which the men commemorated at Thiepval fell. One is simply titled 'Somme 1916'. Thirteen battles so-named on the other roundels are Ancre Heights, Ancre, Albert, High Wood, Delville Wood, Morval, Flers–Courcelette, Pozières Wood, Bazentin Ridge, Thiepval Ridge, Transloy Ridges, Ginchy, and Guillemont. The final two roundels are for 'Bapaume' and 'Miraumont', most likely referring to battles or actions in the Somme frontline in 1917 as the Thiepval Memorial includes the missing dead that fell before 20 March 1918. The Actions of Miraumont took place from 17 to 18 February 1917, and Bapaume was occupied by the British on 17 March 1917 (see Operations on the Ancre, January–March 1917).

Notable people commemorated on the memorial
Seven Victoria Cross recipients are listed on the memorial, under their respective regiments. All British unless otherwise noted:
 Eric Norman Frankland Bell
 William Buckingham
 Geoffrey St. George Shillington Cather
 William McFadzean
 William Mariner
 Thomas Orde Lawder Wilkinson
 Alexander Young (South African)

Also commemorated are:
 English first-class cricketer Alban Arnold
 English first-class cricketer Sydney Thomas Askham
 Composer George Butterworth
 Irish first-class cricketer William Crozier
 Scots rugby international Rowland Fraser
 English first-class cricketer John Gregory
 England rugby international and clergyman Rupert Inglis
 Irish economist, poet and former British member of parliament Thomas Michael Kettle
 England rugby international John Abbott King
 Irish soccer international Jimmy Maxwell
 England rugby international Alfred Maynard
 Scots rugby international Eric Milroy
 Welsh soccer international Leigh Richmond Roose
 English writer Saki (Hector Hugh Munro)
 English first-class cricketer Ernest Shorrocks
 Welsh rugby international Dick Thomas
 Welsh rugby international Horace Thomas
 Welsh rugby international David Watts

Anglo-French memorial

The Thiepval Memorial also serves as an Anglo-French battle memorial to commemorate the joint nature of the 1916 offensive. In further recognition of this, a cemetery, Thiepval Anglo-French Cemetery, containing 300 British Commonwealth and 300 French graves lies at the foot of the memorial. Most of the soldiers buried here – 239 of the British Commonwealth and 253 of the French – are unknown, the bodies having been reburied here after discovery between December 1931 and March 1932, mostly from the Somme battlefields but some from as far north as Loos and as far south as Le Quesnel. The British Commonwealth graves have rectangular headstones made of white stone, while the French graves have grey stone crosses. On the British headstones is the inscription "A Soldier of the Great War/ Known unto God". The French crosses bear the single word "Inconnu" ('unknown'). The cemetery's Cross of Sacrifice bears an inscription that acknowledges the joint British and French contributions:

Ceremonies and services
Each year on 1 July (the anniversary of the first day on the Somme) a major ceremony is held at the memorial. There is also a ceremony on 11 November, beginning at 1045 CET.

See also
 World War I memorials

References

Works cited

External links

 Thiepval Memorial to the Missing of the Somme (Commonwealth War Graves Commission)
 

World War I memorials in France
Battle of the Somme
Monuments and memorials in Somme (department)
Commonwealth War Graves Commission cemeteries in France
Commonwealth War Graves Commission memorials
British military memorials and cemeteries
Works of Edwin Lutyens in France
War memorials by Edwin Lutyens
Art Deco architecture in France
South African military memorials and cemeteries
Buildings and structures completed in 1932
20th-century architecture in South Africa